Plavni (meaning "reed bed") may refer to the following places:

Ukraine
 Plavni, Odessa Oblast, village in Reni Raion, Odessa Oblast
 Plavni, Poltava Oblast, village in Kozelshchyna Raion, Poltava Oblast
 Plavni, Zaporizhia Oblast, village in Vasylivka Raion, Zaporizhia Oblast